Thalaikoothal (lit. showering) is the traditional practice of senicide (killing of the elderly) or involuntary euthanasia, by their own family members, observed in some parts of southern districts of Tamil Nadu state of India.

Methods
Typically, the  person is given an extensive oil-bath early in the morning and subsequently made to drink glasses of tender coconut water which results in kidney failure, high fever, fits, and death within a day or two. This technique may also involve a head massage with cold water, which may lower body temperature sufficiently to cause heart failure. Alternative methods involve force feeding cow's milk while plugging the nose, causing breathing difficulties (the "milk therapy") or use of poisons.

Incidence
Although thalaikoothal is illegal in India, the practice has long received covert social acceptance as a form of mercy killing, and people seldom complain to the police. In some cases the family informs their relatives before performing thalaikoothal, and the victims sometimes even requests it. However, social acceptance may lead to more egregious abuses: the issue gained a higher profile in early 2010, when an 80-year-old man escaped after discovering his intended fate and heard his family members discussing how they were going to "share" his lands, and took refuge in a relative's home.

Investigation revealed the practice to be "fairly widespread" in the southern districts of Tamil Nadu. Dozens or perhaps hundreds of cases occur annually.

Response
In 2010, after an exposé in Virudhunagar district the administration set up teams of officers to monitor the senior citizens.

Representation in modern cinema
 Thalaikoothal (2023)
 K.D. Engira Karuppudurai (2019)
 Baaram (2019)

See also 
 Death by coconut

References

External links
 Defining Mercy Pallium India, March 2010
 Mother, shall I put you to sleep? tehelka.com

Old age in India
Tamil culture
Tamil society
Death in India
Senicide